NGC 7066 is a spiral galaxy located about 210 million light-years away in the constellation of Pegasus. NGC 7066 was discovered by astronomer Lewis Swift on August 31, 1886.

See also 
 List of NGC objects (7001–7840)

References

External links 

Spiral galaxies
Pegasus (constellation)
7066
66747
Astronomical objects discovered in 1886
11741